William James Wood "Buller" Stadden (1861 –30 December 1906) was a Welsh international rugby union half back who played club rugby for Canton, Cardiff and Dewsbury. Stadden won eight caps for Wales over a period of seven years and is most remembered for scoring the winning try in 1890 to give Wales their first victory over England. He committed suicide in Dewsbury after murdering his wife.

Rugby career
Stadden made his début for Wales against Ireland in 1884 under the captaincy of Joe Simpson in the Home Nations Championship. Stadden scored a drop goal on his début and along with tries from William Norton and Tom Clapp, gave Wales their first win on Welsh soil. Stadden was not selected for the next tournament, but regained his position in 1886 playing in both matches of the series against England and Scotland. Wales lost both games, but Stadden managed to score again, this time with a try, in the opening match over England.

In September 1886, Stadden, along with fellow Cardiff team-mate Angus Stuart, left Cardiff for Dewsbury in West Yorkshire, pleading that there were no employment prospects for him in Wales. Though it was later discovered that he was working for a textile company part-owned by the Dewsbury club's president. 
Staddens' last season at Cardiff was the year when, under the captaincy of Frank Hancock, Cardiff perfected the quick passing 'four three-quarter system'. The team won 26 of their 27 games and scored 131 tries whilst conceding only four. He continued to play for Wales and for Yorkshire. He was the first Welsh player to be bought by an English club and he evolved into a star player in Yorkshire, which was the best team in England at the time.

Stadden's next two matches for Wales were against Ireland as part of the 1887 Championship, partnered with John Goulstone Lewis, and Scotland in 1888 with Cardiff team-mate Jem Evans; both were Welsh wins. Towards the end of 1888, Wales hosted their first overseas tourists when the New Zealand Native team visited Britain. Under the captaincy of Frank Hill, Stadden partnered Charlie Thomas in a Welsh win over the Māori team. Stadden's last games for Wales both came in the 1890 Home Nations Championship, the first was a loss to Scotland at the Cardiff Arms Park, the second was Wales' first ever win over England. Stadden was the Welsh hero of the match after scoring the only point of the game played in England at Dewsbury. Early in the second half, Stadden took a line out and motioned that he was going to throw the ball long. The Welsh and England lines both shuffled back expecting a long throw, for Stadden to bounce the ball into the ground close to his feet, regathering the ball he rushed past two defending players to score the winning try. Bouncing the ball from the line out was banned under IRB rules in 1906.

International games played
Wales
  1886, 1890
  1884, 1887
  1888
  1886, 1888, 1890

Change of Code
When Dewsbury converted from the rugby union code to the rugby league code on 3 September 1898, William Stadden would have been approximately 37 years of age. Consequently, he may have been both a rugby union and rugby league footballer for Dewsbury.

Personal life
On Christmas night 1906 Stadden strangled his wife in their bed. Then, with five children and a lodger asleep on the premises, he attempted to slash his own throat before surrendering to the police. He died three days later. He is buried in an unmarked grave in Dewsbury Cemetery.

Bibliography

References

External links
Search for "Stadden" at rugbyleagueproject.org

1861 births
1906 suicides
Canton RFC players
Cardiff RFC players
Dewsbury Rams players
English murderers
English rugby league players
English rugby union players
Murder–suicides in the United Kingdom
Rugby league players from Bristol
Rugby union players from Clifton, Bristol
Suicides by sharp instrument in England
Wales international rugby union players